Dressed to Thrill is a 1935 American musical film directed by Harry Lachman and written by Samson Raphaelson. The film stars Tutta Rolf, Clive Brook, Robert Barrat, Nydia Westman and Dina Smirnova. The film was released on August 16, 1935, by Fox Film Corporation.
 
It was a remake of the 1932 French film The Dressmaker of Luneville which had also been directed by Lachman.

Plot

Cast 
Tutta Rolf as Colette Dubois / Nadia Petrova
Clive Brook as Bill Trent
Robert Barrat as Gaston Dupont
Nydia Westman as Anne Trepied
Dina Smirnova as Sonya

References

External links 
 

1935 films
20th Century Fox films
American musical films
1935 musical films
Films directed by Harry Lachman
American black-and-white films
American remakes of French films
American films based on plays
1930s English-language films
1930s American films